Kozlu Dam is a dam in Zonguldak Province, Turkey, built between 1979 and 1986. The development was backed by the Turkish State Hydraulic Works.

See also
List of dams and reservoirs in Turkey

External links
DSI directory, State Hydraulic Works (Turkey), Retrieved December 16, 2009

Dams in Zonguldak Province